Enrico Baldini (born 13 November 1996) is an Italian footballer who plays as a forward for  club Cittadella.

Club career

Inter
Baldini began playing with Carrarese's and Spezia's youth systems, before being signed by Inter in 2012.

He made his official debut in European competition for Internazionale on 11 December 2014 during the group stage match of Europa League campaign against Azerbaijani side FK Qarabağ.
In 2016 he was loaned to Pro Vercelli.
At the end of 2016–17 season, Baldini returned to Inter. He was part of the squad in the first day of pre-season training, but was transferred to Ascoli on a three-year contract on 26 July.

Ascoli
Baldini joined Ascoli on 26 July 2017. He was assigned number 29 shirt of the first team.

Fano
On 14 August 2019, he signed a one-year contract with Serie C club Fano. On 30 September 2020 he returned to Fano on a two-year contract.

Cittadella
On 18 January 2021, he moved to Serie B club Cittadella. On 17 May, he scored a hat trick in the promotion playoff semi-final first leg to help Cittadella advance to the final round.

International career
He has represented Italy at U-17, U-18, U-19, U-20 levels.

Honours

Club
Inter Primavera
 Torneo di Viareggio: 2015
 Coppa Italia Primavera: 2015–16

References

External links
 
 FIGC 

1996 births
People from Massa
Sportspeople from the Province of Massa-Carrara
Living people
Italian footballers
Italy youth international footballers
Association football midfielders
Inter Milan players
F.C. Pro Vercelli 1892 players
Ascoli Calcio 1898 F.C. players
Alma Juventus Fano 1906 players
A.S. Cittadella players
Serie B players
Serie C players
Footballers from Tuscany